The Critics' Choice Movie Awards (formerly known as the Broadcast Film Critics Association Award) is an awards show presented annually by the American-Canadian Critics Choice Association (CCA) to honor the finest in cinematic achievement. Written ballots are submitted during a week-long nominating period, and the resulting nominees are announced in December. The winners chosen by subsequent voting are revealed at the annual Critics' Choice Movie Awards ceremony in January. Additionally, special awards are given out at the discretion of the BFCA Board of Directors.
This award  is also an indicator of success at the Academy Awards.

History
The awards were originally named simply Critics' Choice Awards. In 2010, the word Movie was added to their name, to differentiate them from the Critics' Choice Television Awards, which were first bestowed the following year by the newly created Broadcast Television Critics Association. The name Critics' Choice Awards now officially refers to both sets of awards collectively.

From 2006 through 2009, the awards ceremony was held in the Santa Monica Civic Auditorium. From 2010 through 2012, it took place in the refurbished, historic Hollywood Palladium. Broadcasting the ceremony began with the sixth ceremony on E! Entertainment Television in 2001 for four years, followed by The WB Network for two years, before returning to E! for a year.  VH1 took over the broadcast in 2008. The live television broadcast of the event moved from VH1 to The CW in 2013, with the 19th ceremony airing on January 16, 2014, live from the Barker Hangar in Santa Monica, California. In October 2014, it was announced that the Critics' Choice Movie Awards would move to A&E for 2015 and 2016.

It then returned to The CW for 2017, where it has aired since. Traditionally the ceremony has aired in the second week of January, deferring to the Golden Globe Awards, which has long claimed the first Sunday of January to open up the previous year's film awards season. It then claimed the first Sunday of January in 2022 after the Hollywood Foreign Press Association became enshrined in controversy over a lack of membership diversity and other building issues, and after the organization had not done enough, an industry boycott developed to the point where NBC said it would not carry the 2022 ceremony and would not televise it again until the HPFA made significant progress in fixing its issues. The CCA then claimed the first January, and by October 26, 2021, a simulcast agreement with TBS (which is a sister network to The CW through their joint venture between Paramount Global and Warner Bros. Discovery) was announced to broaden its viewership.

Categories

Ceremonies

Note: A ceremony is generally referred to by the year of release of the films that it honored, rather than the year in which it was held.

References

External links
Official BFCA website
2011 Critics' Choice Movie Awards on VH1

 
American film awards
Awards established in 1996